Jacoba is a given name, a female version of Jacob, which has been a common given name in the Netherlands. In daily life, many people use(d) short or more modern forms like Coba, Cobi, Cobie, Coby, Coosje, Cootje, Jackie, and Jacqueline.  People with the name include

Middle Ages
Jacoba of Settesoli (Giacoma de Settesoli; 1190–1273), follower of the Italian saint Francis of Assisi
Jacoba of Beieren (1401–1436), Countess of Holland and Zeeland
Jacoba of Loon-Heinsberg (fl. 1446), Dutch abbess
Modern use
Jacoba M.J. "Coby" van Baalen (born 1957), Dutch equestrian
Jacoba van den Brande (1735–1794), Dutch scientist
Jacoba W.H. "Coosje" van Bruggen (1942–2009), Dutch-born American sculptor, art historian, and critic
Jacoba van Heemskerck (1876–1923), Dutch painter, stained glass designer and graphic artist 
Jacoba Hol (1886–1964), physical geographer
Jacoba Adriana Hollestelle (1937–2002), Dutch singer known by the name Conny Vandenbos
Jacoba Maria van Nickelen (c.1690–1749), Dutch flower painter
Jacoba Johanna "Coba" Ritsema (1876–1961), Dutch portrait painter
Jacoba Catharina "Cobie" Sikkens (born 1946), Dutch swimmer
Jacoba F.M. "Cobie" Smulders (born 1982), Canadian actress and model
Jacoba Stelma (1907–1987), Dutch gymnast
Jacoba Surie (1879–1970), Dutch painter
Jacoba van Tongeren (1903–1967), Dutch World War II resistance fighter
Jacoba van Velde (1903–1985), Dutch novelist

Dutch feminine given names